The Kerry Beagle is the only extant scent hound breed native to Ireland.

Description

Appearance 

Despite its name, the Kerry Beagle is a small hound. "Beag" is actually an Irish word for small, given to the dog because it is smaller than other hounds; with its height being between 56–61 cm (22–24 in), and its weight up to 27 kg. The Kerry Beagle has a broad head, a short coat and long ears, black and tan is the more common colour but the coat may be tan and white, blue mottled and tan or black. The breed's looks suggests speed and endurance.

Temperament 
This breed of dog is a pack hound and does hold the hunting instinct strong. They do however make very good pets as they are good with children and other dogs. They require a lot of exercise, regular twice to three times daily walks and free runs.

History and use
The Kerry Beagle believed to date back to the 16th century; detailed pedigrees date back as far as 1794. By the 1800s the Kerry Beagle's numbers had dwindled in Ireland, with only one major pack maintained, the famous Scarteen of County Limerick belonging to the Ryan family, which still exists today.

Originally bred as staghounds, today they are used to hunt fox and hare and take part in drag hunting.

The Kerry Beagle was taken by many Irish immigrants to the Americas, and is considered a foundation breed in the development of the Coonhound and American foxhound.

The name 'Beagle' is thought to derive from the Irish word 'beag' meaning 'small'. The Kerry Beagle was only recognized by the Irish Kennel Club in 1991.

See also
 Dogs portal
 List of dog breeds

References

Footnotes

Bibliography
 Alderton, David, Hounds of the World, Swan Hill Press, Shrewsbury, 2000, .
 Cunliffe, Juliette, The Encyclopedia of Dog Breeds Parragon, 2001, .
 Fogle, Bruce, The Encyclopedia of the Dog, DK Publishing, New York, 2009, .
 Hancock, David, Hounds: Hunting by Scent, The Crowood Press Ltd, Marlborough, 2014, .
 Holland, Anne, Hunting:  portrait, Little Brown, London, 2003, .

External links
 Scarteen website

Dog breeds originating in Ireland